Graciela Figueroa (born January 15, 1944 in Montevideo) is a dancer and choreographer from Uruguay. In 2007 Figueroa worked as choreographer in the musical Maré, Nossa História de Amor a free adaptation of the tragedy of Romeo and Juliet translated to the harsh life in Favela da Maré, one of largest and most violent slums in Rio de Janeiro. The show starred Cristina Lago, Vinícius D'Black and Marisa Orth.

References

Uruguayan female dancers
Living people
Uruguayan choreographers
Place of birth missing (living people)
1944 births